MPCI can refer to:

 Patriotic Movement of Côte d'Ivoire
 Mini PCI
 Multi-peril crop insurance